Leptadrillia firmichorda is a species of sea snail, a marine gastropod mollusk in the family Drilliidae.

Description
The shell grows to a length of 8.6 mm, its diameter 3.1 mm.

Distribution
This species occurs in the demersal zone of the Eastern Pacific Ocean off the Galapagos Islands, Panama and Colombia.

References

  Tucker, J.K. 2004 Catalog of recent and fossil turrids (Mollusca: Gastropoda). Zootaxa 682:1–1295
 McLean & Poorman, 1971. New species of Tropical Eastern Pacific Turridae; The Veliger, 14, 89–113

External links
 
 Biolib.cz: Leptadrillia firmichorda: image

firmichorda
Gastropods described in 1971